Yellowcraig, also known as Broad Sands Beach, is a coastal area of forest, beach and grassland in East Lothian, south-east Scotland. Yellowcraig is partly within the Firth of Forth Site of Special Scientific Interest (SSSI). It is bordered to the north by the Firth of Forth, to the south by the village of Dirleton and Dirleton Castle, to the east by the North Berwick West Links golf course, and to the west by the Archerfield Estate and Links golf courses.

Access to Yellowcraig is by the A198 coastal route through Dirleton. The area includes information displays, a barbecue area and a Treasure Island themed adventure play park. WCs and showers are located at the car park. There is also a wheelchair accessible path and ramp giving a view over the beach.

Yellowcraig is featured in the leaflet Aberlady to North Berwick among a series of leaflets on the John Muir Way. The John Muir Way is part of the North Sea Trail, a network of paths in 7 countries and 26 areas around the North Sea.

The island of Fidra, reputedly the inspiration for Robert Louis Stevenson's Treasure Island, lies just to the north-west and is an RSPB nature reserve.

The East Lothian Countryside Ranger Service co-ordinates the day-to-day management of this site.

References

Protected areas of East Lothian
Beaches of Scotland
Sites of Special Scientific Interest in Mid and East Lothian